Ruby Creek is a tributary of the Fraser River in the Lower Mainland of British Columbia, Canada, rising in the southern Lillooet Ranges and joining the Fraser east of Sea Bird Island at the locality of Ruby Creek and the associated Ruby Creek Indian Reserve No. 2.  It is the largest tributary along the north side of the Fraser between Hope and Agassiz.

References

Lillooet Ranges
Rivers of the Lower Mainland
Tributaries of the Fraser River
Rivers of the Pacific Ranges